George Motherby M.D. (baptised 1731 – 1793) was an English physician and medical writer. He is noted for the early definition of the medical term placebo in the 1785 edition of his medical dictionary.

Life
He was born in Yorkshire, the son of George Motherby and his wife Anne Hotham; Robert Motherby was a younger brother, and his elder sister Anne married the London bookseller George Robinson (1736–1801). He gained an MD degree at King's College, Aberdeen in 1767.

Motherby then practised  as a physician at Königsberg, in the Kingdom of Prussia. Through Robert, he came to be on good terms there with Johann Georg Hamann; and vaccinated one of his sons.

Motherby was later at Highgate, Middlesex. He died at Beverley, Yorkshire, in July 1793.

Works 
Motherby compiled A new Medical Dictionary, London, 1775 (2nd edit. 1785). Other editions, revised by George Wallis, M.D., appeared in 1791, 1795, and 1801; the two final editions were in two volumes. The articles included citations. A study of the first edition concluded that the most cited authorities were William Lewis (when his translation from Caspar Neumann is included), John Ray, and Herman Boerhaave; followed by Hippocrates and Galen.

Notes

Attribution

1731 births
1793 deaths
18th-century English medical doctors
English medical writers
English lexicographers
People from Yorkshire